John Deverell (30 May 1880 in London, England – 2 March 1965 in Haywards Heath, Sussex, England) was a British actor.

Selected filmography
 John Forrest Finds Himself (1920) – The Hon. Vere Blair
 Children of Chance (1930) – Harold
Alibi (1931) – Lord Halliford
A Night in Montmartre (1932) – cast member
 Monte Carlo Madness (1932) – Consul
 Above Rubies (1932) – Lord Middlehurst
The Path of Glory (1934) – Paul
 The King of Paris (1934) – Bertrand
The Divine Spark (1935) – the King
Marry the Girl (1935) – Judge
They Didn't Know (1936) – Lord Budmarsh
Get off My Foot (1936) – cast member
Because of Love (original title-Everything in Life) (1936) – John
 The Girl in the Taxi (1937) – Emile Pomerell
The Street Singer (1937) – James the butler
Incident in Shanghai (1938) – Weepie
I've Got a Horse (1938) – Judge
Larry the Lamb (1947 TV Movie) – The Inventor
The Calendar (1948) – rector
The Cruise of the Toytown Belle (1950)- The Inventor
At Your Service, Ltd. (1951-TV Series) – Captain Crowe's Treasure – Justin Crowe
Many Moons (1953 TV Short) – Royal Physician
Thames Tug (1953 TV Series) – Ebb & Flow (Dr. Spurgeon), Uncle John Enjoys a Joke (Dr. Spurgeon), The Gent and the Joker (Dr. Spurgeon)
BBC Sunday-Night Theatre – (1950–1959 TV Series) The Perfect Woman (1956) – Prof. Archibald Belmon

References

External links

1880 births
1965 deaths
English male film actors
English male silent film actors
Male actors from London
20th-century English male actors